Phytolacca americana, also known as American pokeweed, pokeweed, poke sallet, dragonberries, and inkberry, is a poisonous, herbaceous perennial plant in the pokeweed family Phytolaccaceae. This pokeweed grows . It has simple leaves on green to red or purplish stems and a large white taproot. The flowers are green to white, followed by berries which ripen through red to purple to almost black which are a food source for songbirds such as gray catbird, northern mockingbird, northern cardinal, and brown thrasher, as well as other birds and some small non-avian animals (i.e., for species that are unaffected by its mammalian toxins).

Pokeweed is native to eastern North America, the Midwest, and the South, with more scattered populations in the far West. It is also naturalized in parts of Europe and Asia. It is considered a pest species by farmers. Pokeweed is poisonous to humans, dogs, and livestock. In spring and early summer, shoots and leaves (not the root) are edible with proper cooking (hence the common name "poke sallet"), but later in the summer they become deadly, and the berries are also poisonous. It is used as an ornamental in horticulture, and it provokes interest for the variety of its natural products (toxins and other classes), for its ecological role, its historical role in traditional medicine, and for some utility in biomedical research (e.g., in studies of pokeweed mitogen). In the wild, it is easily found growing in pastures, recently cleared areas, and woodland openings, edge habitats such as along fencerows, and in wastelands.

The first word in its scientific name, Phytolacca americana, comes from the Greek words phyton (plant) and lacca (crimson lake)—-a reference to its deep-reddish-purple fruits. The second denotes this plant as native to America.  The common name "poke" is derived from puccoon, pocan, or poughkone (from an Algonquin name for the plant). Its berries were once used to make ink, hence its other sometimes-used common name, inkberry.

Description

One to several branches grow from the crown of a thick, white, fleshy taproot; Michael D. K. Owen describes the branches as "stout, smooth, [and] green to somewhat purplish". Simple, entire leaves with long petioles are alternately arranged along the stem.

Pokeweeds reproduce only by their large, glossy black, lens-shaped seeds, which are contained in a fleshy, 10-celled, purple-to-near-black berry that has crimson juice. The flowers are perfect, radially symmetric, white or green, with 4–5 sepals and no petals. The flowers develop in elongated clusters termed racemes. The seeds have long viability, able to germinate after many years in the soil.

Morphology 

Plant Type: Perennial herbaceous plant which can reach a height of  but is usually . The plant must be a few years old before the root grows large enough to support this size. The stem is usually red late in the season. There is an upright, erect central stem early in the season, which changes to a spreading, horizontal form later with the weight of the berries. The plant dies back to the roots each winter. The stem has a chambered pith.

Leaves: The leaves are alternate with coarse texture with moderate porosity. Leaves can reach  in length. Each leaf is entire. Leaves are medium green and smooth, with a distinct odor that many characterize as unpleasant.

They have white petal-like sepals without true petals, on white pedicels and peduncles in an upright or drooping raceme, which darken as the plant fruits. Blooms first appear in early summer and continue into early fall.

Fruit: A shiny dark purple berry held in racemose clusters on pink pedicels with a pink peduncle. Pedicels without berries have a distinctive rounded five part calyx. Fruits are round with a flat indented top and bottom. Immature berries are green, turning white and then blackish purple.

Root: Thick central taproot which grows deep and spreads horizontally. Rapid growth. Tan cortex, white pulp, moderate number of rootlets. Transversely cut root slices show concentric rings. No nitrogen fixation ability.

Chemistry 

The entire pokeweed plant contains triterpene saponins such as phytolaccagenin, jaligonic acid, phytolaccagenic acid (phytolaccinic acid), esculentic acid, and pokeberrygenin (in the berries), as well as phytolaccasides A, B, D, E, and G, and phytolaccasaponins B, E, and G (in the roots).

The roots also contain other triterpenoids such as oleanolic acid, α-spinasterol and its glucoside, α-spinasteryl-β-D-glucoside, and a palmityl-derivative, 6-palmytityl-α-spinasteryl-6-D-glucoside, as well as a similarly functionalized stigmasterol derivative, 6-palmityl-Δ7-stigmasterol-Δ-D-glucoside. Pokeweed berries also contain betalain pigments such as betanin and others. The leaves contain a number of common flavonols. Seeds of pokeweed contain the phenolic aldehyde caffeic aldehyde. Pokeweed also contains lectins, such as pokeweed mitogen.

Common names
Phytolacca americana or pokeweed is also known as pokeberry, poke root, Virginia poke (or simply poke), pigeonberry, inkberry, redweed or red ink plant. When used in Chinese medicine, it is called chuíxù shānglù. As food, it is called poke sallet, or more commonly poke salad, sometimes spelled polk salad.

Distribution and habitat 
Pokeweed is native to eastern North America, the Midwest, the Gulf Coast, and the West Coast of the US. It is an introduced weed in Japan.

Ecology 
Birds are unaffected by the poisons in the berries, and eat them, dispersing the seeds. The berries are reported to be a good food source for songbirds and other bird species and small animals that are unaffected by its toxins. Distribution via birds is thought to account for the appearance of isolated plants in areas otherwise free from pokeweed.

Pokeweed berries are reported to be a good food source for songbirds such as gray catbird (Dumetella carolinensis), northern mockingbird (Mimus polyglottos), northern cardinal (Cardinalis cardinals), brown thrasher (Toxostoma rufum), other bird species including mourning dove (Zenaida macroura), and cedar waxwing (Bombycilla cedrorum). Small mammals apparently tolerant of its toxins include raccoon, opossum, red and gray fox, and the white-footed mouse.

Pokeweed is used as a sometime food source by the larvae of some Lepidoptera species, including the giant leopard moth (Hypercompe scribonia).

Toxicity 
All parts of the plant can be toxic and pose risks to human and mammalian health. Toxins are found in highest concentration in the rootstock, then leaves and stems, then the ripe fruit. The plant generally gets more toxic with maturity, with the exception of the berries, which are dangerous even while green.

Children may be attracted by clusters of berries. Ohio Agricultural Research and Development Center (OARDC) notes:

Pokeweed is to be avoided during pregnancy and children consuming even one berry may require emergency treatment. The plant sap can cause dermatitis in sensitive people.

The plant is not palatable to most animals and is avoided unless little else is available or it is present in contaminated hay, but horses, sheep and cattle have been poisoned by eating fresh leaves or green fodder and pigs have been poisoned by eating the roots.

If death occurs, it is usually due to respiratory paralysis.

Pokeweed poisoning was common in eastern North America during the 19th century, especially from the use of tinctures as antirheumatic preparations and from ingestion of berries and roots that were mistaken for parsnip, Jerusalem artichoke, or horseradish.

Symptoms and response to poisoning
Owen states:

The OARDC staff scientists note that symptoms of poisoning include "a burning sensation in the mouth, salivation, gastrointestinal cramps, and vomiting and bloody diarrhea", and that depending upon the amount consumed, more severe symptoms can occur, including "anemia, altered heart rate and respiration, convulsions and death from respiratory failure." If only small quantities are ingested, people and animals recover within one to two days.

Uses

Horticulture

Some pokeweeds are grown as ornamental plants, mainly for their attractive berries. A number of cultivars have been selected for larger fruit panicles.

Folk and alternative medicine 

Owen notes that "Indians and early settlers used the root in poultices and certain drugs for skin diseases and rheumatism."

The late 19th century herbal, the King's American Dispensatory, describes various folk medical uses that led individuals to ingest pokeberry products. Phytolacca extract was advertised as a prescription weight loss drug in the 1890s.

Pokeweed is promoted in alternative medicine as a dietary supplement intended to treat a wide range of maladies including mumps, arthritis and various skin conditions. While pokeweed has been subject to laboratory research, there is no medical evidence that it has any beneficial effect on human health.

Food uses
Poke is a traditional southern Appalachian food. The leaves and stems of young plants can be eaten, but must be cooked by boiling two or more times with the water drained and replaced each time. The leaves taste similar to spinach; the stems, similar to asparagus. A typical recipe is to remove the leaves from the young plant, rinse them in cool water, bring the leaves to a rolling boil in a large pot for about 20 minutes, discard the cooking water, rinse them in cool water, repeat the boiling and the rinsing at least two more times, panfry the leaves in bacon grease for two minutes, add bacon, and salt and pepper to taste.

The roots are poisonous, as are mature leaves and stems. Some festivals still celebrate the plant's use in its historical food preparations.

As late as the 1990s two companies commercially canned and sold pokeweed, but in 2000 the last one, the Allen Canning Company of Siloam Springs, Arkansas, closed down its operation.

Nutrition 

A 100g serving of pokeweed contains 20 calories and 3.1 grams of carbohydrates, 1.6 grams of sugars, 1.5 grams of dietary fiber, 0.4 grams of fat, 2.3 grams of protein, and is a rich source of vitamin A, vitamin B2, vitamin C, vitamin K, and manganese. It contains low levels of vitamin B1, vitamin B6, iron, calcium, magnesium, phosphorus, and potassium.

Other uses 
Plant toxins from Phytolacca are being explored as a means to control zebra mussels.

The toxic extract of ripe pokeweed berries can be processed to yield a pink dye. Early European settlers to North America would procure a fine red dye from the plant's roots.

During the middle of the 19th century wine often was coloured with juice from pokeberries.

Phytolacca contains lectins known as Pokeweed mitogen which are used to stimulate B-cell proliferation which is useful for B-cell assays, immunodeficiency diagnostic test, and immunotherapy.

Cultural significance

In music
A 1969 hit written and performed by Tony Joe White, "Polk Salad Annie", is about poke sallet, the cooked greens-like dish made from pokeweed. The lyrics include:And in the fields looks somethin' like a turnip green
And everybody calls it polk salad, polk salad

Elvis Presley covered the song.

In local Southern festivals
Poke salad festivals are held annually in several small southern towns, though often these celebrations are only remotely related to the plant as food or medicine (see  and individual festival references below). Locations include:
 Toccoa, Georgia
 Arab, Alabama
 Blanchard, Louisiana
 Gainesboro, Tennessee
 Harlan, Kentucky

In Oklahoma, poke salad may be added to the annual wild onion dinners.

References

Further reading and viewing
 P.A.G.M. De Smet, 1993, "Phytolacca americana," in Adverse Effects of Herbal Drugs, Volume 2 (Peter A. G. M. Smet, Konstantin Keller, Rudolf Hänsel, & R. Frank Chandler, Eds.), Berlin:Springer Science & Business Media, 
 ACS, 2008, "Entry: Pokeweed," at Find Support & Treatment; Treatments and Side Effects Complementary and Alternative Medicine; Herbs, Vitamins, and Minerals, see ACS Pokeweed entry, accessed 2 May 2015.
 Tyler, V. E.; Brady, L. R. & Robbers, J. E., 1988, "Poisonous plants," in Pharmacognosy, 9th ed. Philadelphia:Lea and Febiger, Chapter 15, pp. 438–455.
 
 "Tony Joe White – Polk Salad Annie," performance, date unknown, at Tony Joe White – Polk Salad Annie, accessed 2 May 2015.
 "Tony Joe White and Johnny Cash," performance, 1970, "Polk Salad (Poke Salit) Annie," from Johnny Cash Show, episode no. 27, April 8, 1970, at LiveLeak (online), see Tony Joe White & Johnny Cash-Polk Salad Annie, accessed 2 May 2015.
 Brennan Carley, 2014, "Foo Fighters Join Tony Joe White on Bluesy 'Polk Salad Annie' on 'Letterman'," Spin (online), October 16, 2014, see Foo Fighters Join Tony Joe White on Bluesy 'Polk Salad Annie' on 'Letterman', accessed 2 May 2015.

External links

 
 
 
 
 
 
  Image of bluebird feeding on pokeweed.

Flora of North America
Herbs
Leaf vegetables
americana
Plants described in 1753
Taxa named by Carl Linnaeus
Plants used in traditional Native American medicine
Cuisine of the Southern United States
Poisonous plants